"Consider Yourself" is a song from the 1960 original West End and Broadway musical Oliver! and the 1968 film of the same name. It was introduced on Broadway by Davy Jones and the ensemble. In the 1968 film version, it is performed in the market and led by Jack Wild's Artful Dodger. In all versions, Dodger sings it when he first meets Oliver, after offering to get the destitute and alone boy food and lodging. Lyrically, it is an enthusiastic gift of friendship from Dodger and his as-yet-unseen gang to Oliver, assuring him warmly he can consider himself "our mate" and "one of the family" as "it's clear we're going to get along". The 1968 film builds it to a spectacular extended song-and-dance routine involving the street crowd, market workers, policemen and chimney sweep boys.

In popular culture
 
 This song was sung in the 1969 premiere episode of Sesame Street.
 In October 1975, this song was adapted into Japanese to welcome Emperor Hirohito at Central Park, New York City.
 In 1977, the song was sung by The Muppets on the seventh episode of the second season of The Muppet Show to its guest star Edgar Bergen and his dummy, Charlie McCarthy.
 A rearranged version of the song was used as the theme of the ITV sitcom Home to Roost.
 The first couple lines of the song were sung by Carlton Banks and the Alagaroos in the 13th episode of the 1st season of The Fresh Prince of Bel-Air
 In Christmas 2011, BBC One used famous celebrities to sing the song for promotion.
 During the COVID-19 pandemic a rewritten version of the song was aired during trailer breaks in CBBC and CBeebies programming, featuring cast members/presenters of TV shows aired on both channels wishing viewers well during national lockdown. The tagline was "consider yourself part of our family".

References

External links
Oliver! Movie Clip of Consider Yourself

Songs about friendship
Songs written by Lionel Bart
Songs from Oliver!
Pinky and Perky songs
1960 songs